Tanaopsis rawhitia is a species of tanaidomorphan malacostracan crustacean found in New Zealand.

References

Further reading
Segadilha, Juliana L., and Catarina L. Araújo-Silva. "Two new species of Tanaopsis (Tanaidacea: Tanaopsidae) from Admiralty Bay (Antarctica), with an identification key." Nauplius 23.1 (2015): 31–45.
Błażewicz-Paszkowycz, Magdalena, Roger N. Bamber, and Piotr Jóźwiak. "Tanaidaceans (Crustacea: Peracarida) from the SoJaBio joint expedition in slope and deeper waters in the Sea ofJapan." Deep-Sea Research Part II: Topical Studies in Oceanography 86 (2013): 181–213.

External links

WORMS

Malacostraca
Marine crustaceans of New Zealand